The Kind Words is a 2015 Israeli drama film directed by Shemi Zarhin. It was nominated for Best Film at the 2015 Ophir Awards. It was screened in the Contemporary World Cinema section of the 2015 Toronto International Film Festival.

Plot
After the death of their mother, three Jewish Israeli siblings discover the man who raised them might not be their biological father. They plan to visit their aunt in France to learn the truth, but she evades their questions. Later, they find out the man they were looking is an Algerian, Maurice Leon, but he himself doesn't reveal who he his or his religion.

Cast
Rotem Zissman-Cohen as Dorona
 Assaf Ben-Shimon as Shai
Roy Assaf as Netanel
Levana Finkelstein as Yona Baruch
Sasson Gabai as The Father
Tzachi Halevy as Rikki
Maurice Bénichou as Maurice Lyon

Reception
The Kind Words has a 78% on Rotten Tomatoes based on 9 reviews as well as 75% approval, based on 5 reviews on Metacritic.

References

External links

2015 films
2015 drama films
Israeli drama films
2010s Hebrew-language films